Ekaterina Makarova and Elena Vesnina defeated Chan Hao-ching and Monica Niculescu in the final, 6–0, 6–0 to win the ladies' doubles tennis title at the 2017 Wimbledon Championships. It marked the first time since 1953 where the final scoreline was a double bagel. The win also earned the team their third major title together.

Serena and Venus Williams were the defending champions, but they did not compete due to Serena's pregnancy.

Top seeds Bethanie Mattek-Sands and Lucie Šafářová were attempting to achieve a non-calendar-year Grand Slam, having won the preceding US Open, Australian Open, and French Open titles. However, the pair withdrew prior to their second-round match after Mattek-Sands suffered a knee injury in the second round of the singles competition the previous day.

Seeds

Qualifying

Draw

Finals

Top half

Section 1

Section 2

Bottom half

Section 3

Section 4

References

 Women's Doubles Draw

External links
 2017 Wimbledon Championships - Ladies' Doubles Draw
2017 Wimbledon Championships – Women's draws and results at the International Tennis Federation

Women's Doubles
Wimbledon Championship by year – Women's doubles